Masio (Mas in Piedmontese) is a comune (municipality) in the Province of Alessandria in the Italian region Piedmont, located about  southeast of Turin and about  southwest of Alessandria.

Masio borders the following municipalities: Cerro Tanaro, Cortiglione, Felizzano, Incisa Scapaccino, Oviglio, Quattordio, and Rocchetta Tanaro.

References

External links
 www.masioinrete.it/

Cities and towns in Piedmont